The men's 1500 metre freestyle competition of the swimming events at the 1975 Pan American Games took place on 23 October. The last Pan American Games champion was Pat Miles of the United States.

This race consisted of thirty lengths of the pool, all lengths being in freestyle.

Results
All times are in minutes and seconds.

Heats

Final 
The final was held on October 23.

References

Swimming at the 1975 Pan American Games